Berks, Bucks and Oxon Division 4 is an English rugby union league featuring teams from Berkshire, Buckinghamshire and Oxfordshire which is currently divided into two regional divisions - Berks/Bucks & Oxon 4 North and Berks/Bucks & Oxon 4 South. As with all of the divisions in this area at this level, the entire league is made up of second, third and fourth teams of clubs whose first teams play at a higher level of the rugby union pyramid. Promoted teams move up to Berks/Bucks & Oxon 3 and since the disbanding of the short-lived Berks/Bucks & Oxon 5 at the end of 2011-12 there has been no relegation.

The league was created in 2011-12 as a single division but split into north and south regions for 2013-14.

Participating Clubs 2016-17

North
Abingdon II
Aylesbury III
Banbury III
Bicester III
Chipping Norton II
Gosford All Blacks II
Grove III
Harwell II
Wheatley II
Witney IV

South
Didcot II
High Wycombe III
Hungerford II
Marlow III
Phoenix II
Reading Abbey IV
Slough II
Tadley III
Thatcham III
Windsor IV

Berks/Bucks & Oxon 4 Honours

See also
 Berkshire RFU
 Buckinghamshire RFU
 Oxfordshire RFU
 English rugby union system
 Rugby union in England

References

Rugby union leagues in the English Midlands
Rugby union in Buckinghamshire
Rugby union in Oxfordshire
Rugby union in Berkshire